The Pantaneiro is a cattle breed from the Pantanal region of Brazil, where it has been raised for more than three hundred years. It is now considered to be at risk of extinction.

History 

The Pantaneiro derives from Spanish cattle brought to the Americas by the conquistadores at the time of the colonisation of the Río de la Plata basin, and has been raised there for more than three hundred years. From the eighteenth century it was influenced by breeds of Portuguese origin such as the Curraleiro and Franqueiro. DNA studies have shown that there has been contamination of the breed through the use of bulls of the zebuine cattle breeds introduced to the Pantanal region during the twentieth century; influence of zebuine cows was excluded, as the mitochondrial DNA was found to be entirely taurine.

The Pantaneiro was the principal breed of the Pantanal for several centuries. It is now considered to be at risk of extinction. In 2003 a population of less than 1000 was reported.

Characteristics 

The Pantaneiro is a small breed; the coat is short, and brown or reddish-brown in colour, with a tendency to lighten on the back. It is well adapted to the extreme climatic conditions of the Pantanal region, which is characterised by high temperatures and periods both of flooding and high humidity, and of drought. The cattle are rustic and hardy, capable of surviving periods of food scarcity, and resistant to some diseases.

References

Cattle breeds originating in Brazil
Fauna of the Pantanal
Cattle breeds